Xiong Xiling, or Hsiung Hsi-ling; 1870–1937) was a Chinese philanthropist and politician, who served as premier of the Republic of China from July 1913 to February 1914.

Biography
Born in Fenghuang, Xiangxi prefecture of Hunan, China, Xiong was also a Chinese scholar.

In July 1913, Xiong was appointed by Yuan Shikai as the Premier and Finance Minister. However, after a few months, the relationship between Xiong and Yuan began to deteriorate, triggered by their conflicting views on governance. In February 1914, Xiong resigned from the government. 

After he left politics, Xiong became involved in some educational and charitable institutions to help the needy of Beijing and Shanghai. In 1937, Xiong was in Shanghai, helping the refugees during the Battle of Shanghai. After Shanghai fell, he went to British Hong Kong, dying there on 25 December 1937. He was honored with a state funeral.

His daughter Nora Hsiung Chu (1902-1977) became an educator and expert on child welfare.

1870 births
1937 deaths
Republic of China politicians from Hunan
Premiers of the Republic of China
Politicians from Xiangxi
Unity Party (China) politicians
Progressive Party (China) politicians